Lyn Harris is a British independent perfumer who created the fragrance lines Miller Harris, and Perfumer H.

Harris grew up in Yorkshire and Scotland. She trained in perfumery with Monique Schlienger in Paris and then worked with Robertet in Grasse. In 2000, Harris created the Miller Harris perfume and candle line with her partner Christophe Michel, and the line became known for fragrances like L'Air de Rien (which Harris originally created as a bespoke fragrance for Jane Birkin), Citron Citron, Tea Tonique, and Rose Silence. London-based private equity fund Neo Capital took a stake in the company in 2012 and in 2014 Harris, though remaining a consultant and shareholder in Miller Harris, turned her focus to a new venture, Perfumer H, which she launched in 2015.

References

External links
 Miller Harris
 Perfumer H

Perfumers
Living people
Year of birth missing (living people)
Businesspeople from London